Masthugget Church in Gothenburg, Sweden, was built in 1914. The church represents the National Romantic style in Nordic architecture and was designed by Sigfrid Ericson. The church, which has become one of the symbols of Gothenburg, is a popular tourist attraction.

References 

Churches in Gothenburg
1914 establishments in Sweden
Churches completed in 1914
National Romantic architecture in Sweden
Art Nouveau architecture in Sweden
Art Nouveau church buildings in Sweden
Churches in the Diocese of Gothenburg
20th-century Church of Sweden church buildings